The districts of Seoul are the twenty-five gu ("districts"; hangeul:  구; hanja: 區) comprising Seoul, South Korea.  The gu vary greatly in area (from 10 to 47 km2) and population (from less than 140,000 to 630,000). Songpa-gu is the most populated, while Seocho-gu has the largest area.  Gu are similar to London's or New York's boroughs or Tokyo's 23 special wards. Each gu's government handles many of the functions that are handled by city governments in other jurisdictions.  This city-like standing is underscored by the fact that each gu has its own legislative council, mayor and sister cities.  
Each gu is further divided into dong or neighborhoods.  Some gu have only a few dong while others (like Jongno-gu) have a very large number of distinct neighborhoods.

List by population and area
2014 estimate by Seoul Statistics.

General information

See also
Administrative Divisions of South Korea
Districts of South Korea
Special wards of Tokyo
Boroughs of New York City
London borough
Arrondissements of Paris
Municipalities of the Brussels-Capital Region
Districts of Madrid

References

Geography of Seoul
Government of Seoul
 
districts
Seoul